Six Perfections (foaled 2000 in France) is a champion Thoroughbred race horse, bred by the Niarchos family. She is best known for her 2003 win in the Breeders' Cup Mile.

Background
Yogya, Six Perfections' dam, is a half sister of to two-time Breeders Cup Mile winner Miesque. Celtic Swing, Six Perfections' sire, had many group one wins, including a first in the Prix du Jockey Club (French Derby).

Racing career
Six Perfections was trained by Pascal Bary and finished in third or better in thirteen of her fourteen starts, including a 2nd in the 1,000 Guineas.

For her performance in the 2002 racing season Six Perfections earned the Cartier Award for Two-Year-Old European Champion Filly.

Six Perfections ran in her second Breeders Cup mile in October 2004, where she finished 3rd. Following this race, the horse was retired to broodmare duties, was mated to Storm Cat and subsequently produced a bay colt. The colt was named Planet Five and won the Prix du Gros Chêne in 2010.

In the Eclipse Awards for 2003, Six Perfections finished runner-up in the poll for American Champion Three-Year-Old Filly beaten two votes by the Kentucky Oaks winner Bird Town.

Breeding Record

2006 Planet Five (USA) : bay colt, foaled 28 January, by Storm Cat (USA) - won 3 races including G2 Prix du Gros-Chêne at Chantilly and placed twice including 2nd LR Prix Servanne at Chantilly from 11 starts in France 2008-10.

2011 Faufiler (IRE) : bay filly, foaled 8 May, by Galileo (IRE) - won 5 races including G3 Modesty H, Arlington Park, U.S.A.; LR Prix Prix Casimir Delamarre, Longchamp; LR Prix Montretout, Longchamp and placed 5 times including 2nd G2 Royal Heroine S, Santa Anita, U.S.A.; G3 Prix Messidor, Maisons-Laffitte; 3rd G3 Prix Bertrand de Breuil, Chantilly, from 15 starts to date (14/08/16) in France and the U.S.A. 2014-16.

2014 Yucatan (IRE) : bay colt, foaled 17 May, by Galileo (IRE) - won once and 2nd only two starts to date (28/08/16) in Ireland.

References

 Six Perfections' pedigree and partial racing stats
 YouTube video of Six Perfections' stretch run to win the 2003 Breeders' Cup Mile

Pedigree

2000 racehorse births
Racehorses bred in France
Racehorses trained in France
Breeders' Cup Mile winners
Cartier Award winners
Thoroughbred family 20